James Auld may refer to:

 James Auld (politician) (1921–1982), Canadian politician
 James Muir Auld (1879–1942), Australian artist
 Jim Auld, New Zealand rugby league footballer

See also
 Auld (surname)